Olmos Park is a city in Bexar County, Texas, United States. The population was 2,237 at the 2010 census. The town is noted for its park-like setting, oak-tree lined streets, and large estates, many of which were constructed during the 1920s. The town is four miles north of downtown San Antonio and is surrounded by the city of San Antonio on the west, north, and south side.

History 
Olmos Park was developed in the 1920s as an exclusive suburb of San Antonio, which today completely surrounds it. H.C. Thorman, a renowned oilman and real estate tycoon, purchased property from an Austrian count and developed it into the posh Olmos Park.  The city occupied the site where Camp John Wise was built in 1917.  Camp John Wise was a US Army balloonist training site.  The camp shut down in 1919 when the balloonist training was moved to nearby Brooks Field.

Sometimes confused with the City of Olmos Park, Olmos Park Terrace, was developed by the same developer a few years later in the 1930s as part of his larger Olmos District development and borders Olmos Park's western edge. Olmos Park Terrace was designated a San Antonio Historic District on Oct. 4, 2007 by Ord. 2007-10-04-1070.

Geography

Olmos Park is located 4 miles north of Downtown San Antonio.

It is an enclave of San Antonio, as it is completely bounded by the city. Olmos Park can be found in ZIP Code 78212.

US Route 281 is a north-south highway that bounds one side of the community, the other side being bounded by McCullough Road, a major San Antonio surface street.

Demographics

As of the census of 2000, there were 2,343 people, 1,043 households, and 616 families residing in the city. The population density was 3,860.1 people per square mile (1,483.0/km). There were 1,131 housing units at an average density of 1,863.3/sq mi (715.9/km). The racial makeup of the city was 93.60% White, 2.09% African American, 0.47% Native American, 0.68% Asian, 0.09% Pacific Islander, 2.30% from other races, and 0.77% from two or more races. Hispanic or Latino of any race were 14.60% of the population.

There were 1,043 households, out of which 28.5% had children under the age of 18 living with them, 51.0% were married couples living together, 7.0% had a female householder with no husband present, and 40.9% were non-families. 36.1% of all households were made up of individuals, and 8.2% had someone living alone who was 65 years of age or older. The average household size was 2.24 and the average family size was 2.96.

In the city, the population was spread out, with 23.6% under the age of 18, 5.1% from 18 to 24, 28.1% from 25 to 44, 29.2% from 45 to 64, and 14.1% who were 65 years of age or older. The median age was 41 years. For every 100 females, there were 88.6 males. For every 100 females age 18 and over, there were 84.5 males.

The median income for a household in the city was $87,560, and the median income for a family was $128,814. Males had a median income of $81,296 versus $35,500 for females. The per capita income for the city was $65,697. About 1.9% of families and 3.9% of the population were below the poverty line, including 3.0% of those under age 18 and 2.1% of those age 65 or over. The median home price for 2019 was $756,000.

Government 
Olmos Park adheres to the council-manager form of government.  The mayor is Deanna Rickabaugh.

Education

Most residents of Olmos Park are zoned to the Alamo Heights Independent School District, and  a small portion of Olmos Park is served by the San Antonio Independent School District.

Notable people
Randall L. Stephenson, businessman.

References

External links
 City of Olmos Park

Cities in Bexar County, Texas
Cities in Texas
Greater San Antonio
Populated places established in the 1920s
Enclaves in the United States